Zamenis is a genus of Old World nonvenomous snakes in the family Colubridae.

Name 
Zamenis comes from Greek ζαμενής (lat. vehemens, iracundus) meaning "angry", "irritable", "fierce".

Species
The following 6 species are recognized as being valid:
Zamenis hohenackeri  – Transcaucasian ratsnake
Zamenis lineatus  – Italian Aesculapian snake
Zamenis longissimus  – Aesculapian snake
Zamenis persicus  – Persian ratsnake
Zamenis scalaris  – Ladder snake
Zamenis situla  – European ratsnake

Nota bene: A binomial authority in parentheses indicates that the species was originally described in a genus other than Zamenis.

References

 
Colubrids
Snake genera
Taxa named by Johann Georg Wagler
Taxonomy articles created by Polbot